is a Japanese international school located in Etiler, Beşiktaş, Istanbul, Turkey.

It is Japanese Education and Culture Association (日本文化教育協会, Nihonbunkakyoukai, Turkish: Japon Egitim Kultur Dernegi)and The diploma received here can not be qualified as a Turkish school diploma.

As of 2015 the school has about 80 students. They use a school bus to travel to and from the campus.

See also

 Japanese people in Turkey

References

Further reading
Books and reports by those affiliated with the school:
 Mine, Toshirō (峰 敏朗). イスタンブール日本人学校. 峰敏朗著（JETRO books, 46） 日本貿易振興会, 1998.2. NCID: BA35636978. . See profile at CiNii.
 Kataoka, Sanzou (片岡 三蔵 Kataoka Sanzō; 前イスタンブル日本人学校校長・大阪府大東市立南郷小学校校長). "イスタンブル日本人学校の学校経営." 在外教育施設における指導実践記録 23, 146–150, 2000. Tokyo Gakugei University. See profile at CiNii.

External links
 Istanbul Japanese School 

International schools in Istanbul
Istanbul
Japan–Turkey relations